The Old Forester House is a 1956 West German comedy drama film directed by Harald Philipp and starring Paul Klinger, Anita Gutwell and Trude Hesterberg. It was part of the post-war cycle of heimatfilm.

The film's sets were designed by Mathias Matthies.

Cast

References

Bibliography 
 Davidson, John & Hake, Sabine. Framing the Fifties: Cinema in a Divided Germany. Berghahn Books, 2007.

External links 
 

1956 films
West German films
German musical drama films
1950s musical drama films
1950s German-language films
Films directed by Harald Philipp
1956 drama films
1950s German films